The men's decathlon at the 2008 Summer Olympics took place between August 21 and 22, at the Beijing National Stadium.

The qualifying standards were 8,000 points (A standard) and 7,700 points (B standard).

Schedule
All times are China standard time (UTC+8)

Records
Prior to this competition, the existing world and Olympic records were as follows:

Overall results
Key

References

Specific

Decathlon
2008
Men's events at the 2008 Summer Olympics